The 5th Congress of the Philippines (Filipino: Ikalimang Kongreso ng Pilipinas), composed of the Philippine Senate and House of Representatives, met from January 22, 1962, until December 17, 1965, during the presidency of Diosdado Macapagal.

Sessions
First Regular Session: January 22 – May 17, 1962
Second Regular Session: January 28 – May 23, 1963
First Special Session: June 10 – July 12, 1963
Third Regular Session: January 27 – May 21, 1964
Second Special Session: May 22 – June 25, 1964
Third Special Session: June 26 – July 8, 1964
Fourth Special Session: August 3–15, 1964
Fourth Regular Session: January 25 – May 20, 1965
Fifth Special Session: May 21 – June 24, 1965
Sixth Special Session: June 30 – July 12, 1965
First Joint Session: March 1 – May 5, 1965
Second Joint Session: December 14–17, 1965

Legislation
The Fifth Congress passed a total of 1,192 laws. (Republic Act Nos. 3451 – 4642)

Major legislation

Leadership

Senate
President of the Senate:
Eulogio A. Rodriguez, Sr. (NP)
Ferdinand E. Marcos (LP), elected on April 5, 1963
Senate President Pro-Tempore:
Fernando Lopez  (NP)
Majority Floor Leader:
Cipriano P. Primicias, Sr. (NP)
Arturo M. Tolentino (NP)
Minority Floor Leader:
Estanislao A. Fernandez (LP)

House of Representatives
Speaker:
Daniel Z. Romualdez (NP, 4th District Leyte)
Cornelio T. Villareal (LP, 2nd District Capiz), elected March 9, 1962
Speaker Pro-Tempore:
Salipada K. Pendatun (LP, Lone District Cotabato)
Majority Floor Leader:
Justiniano S. Montano (LP, Lone District Cavite)
Minority Floor Leader:
Cornelio T. Villareal (LP, 2nd District Capiz)
Daniel Z. Romualdez (NP, 4th District Leyte) elected March 9, 1962

Members

Senate

Notes

House of Representatives

See also
Congress of the Philippines
Senate of the Philippines
House of Representatives of the Philippines
1961 Philippine general election
1963 Philippine general election

External links

Further reading
Philippine House of Representatives Congressional Library

05
Third Philippine Republic